José Andrés Pérez Jaime (born September 26, 1972) is a Mexican football manager and former player.

References

1972 births
Living people
Mexican footballers
Association football defenders
Club León footballers
La Piedad footballers
C.D. Veracruz footballers
Lagartos de Tabasco footballers
La Liga players
Ascenso MX players
Footballers from Guanajuato
Sportspeople from León, Guanajuato